Michael and the Magic Man is a novel by Kathleen M. Sidney published in 1980.

Plot summary
Michael and the Magic Man is a novel in which a group of psychics travel America in a van, defending the world from psychic alien invaders.

Reception
Greg Costikyan reviewed Michael and the Magic Man in Ares Magazine #3 and commented that "Sidney is a writer of considerable power; Michael and the Magic Man is as innovative as it is unusual."

Spider Robinson reviewed Michael and the Magic Man for Analog Science Fiction/Science Fact, and commented that "Good characterization, good sense of mood – Kathy is still feeling for her novel-voice, but my only real objection is that the hero is rather ineffectual for my taste. He's not an actor, he's a reactor, for most of the book. Still, this is a cut above most first novels."

Reviews
The New York Review of Science Fiction
Kliatt Young Adult Paperback Book Guide

References

1980 American novels
American science fiction novels